RTV Jablanica or Televizija Jablanica is a local Bosnian  public cable television channel based in Jablanica municipality. It was established in 1999 when local Radio Jablanica started television broadcasting.

RTV Jablanica broadcasts a variety of programs such as local news, local sports, mosaic and documentaries. Program is mainly produced in Bosnian language.

Radio Jablanica is also part of public municipality services.

References

External links 
 Official website of RTV Jablanica
 Communications Regulatory Agency of Bosnia and Herzegovina

Television channels and stations established in 1999
Television stations in Bosnia and Herzegovina
1999 establishments in Bosnia and Herzegovina